Emile Lanners (13 April 1888 – 1963) was a Luxembourgian gymnast who competed in the 1912 Summer Olympics. In 1912 he was a member of the Luxembourgian team which finished fourth in the team, European system competition and fifth in the team, free system event. In the individual all-around he finished 24th.

References

1888 births
1963 deaths
Luxembourgian male artistic gymnasts
Olympic gymnasts of Luxembourg
Gymnasts at the 1912 Summer Olympics